Paljor Stadium (also spelled Palzor Stadium) is a football stadium located in Gangtok, Sikkim, India. The stadium is currently home to Sikkim Premier League clubs, and sometimes also hosts lower division games. It holds 30,000 people. The stadium also hosts matches of the Sikkim Governor's Gold Cup.

History

Foundation
The Paljor Stadium is popularly known as Polo Ground. Chogyal named it around 1943 because Britishers and few members of aristocratic family of Sikkim played at the Polo Ground. While tracing the history of Paljor Stadium it is indeed very difficult to ascertain its origin. The old timers recall this flat piece of land being used by the Tibetan traders to station their herds of Sheep en route to the Sikkim and India. Around 1939 one of the Political Officers, Sir Basil Gould had sanctioned Rs.3000 (approx $75.2634) to the Forest Department and ordered that the grass demonstration farm be set up there. Kikuyu Grass from Africa and Venezuela grass were grown for the soil binding, The whole task was completed in April 1941. Later Paljor Stadium proved to be a major venue of all public meeting including those of Prime ministers and religious leaders. The ground has been hosting the Independence day and republic day celebrations and also all major atheistic events.

Renovation

It was on 24 July 1998 that a High Power state Committee constituted by the government took a decision to upgrade and renovate the existing Paljor Stadium. The project of redesigning and modernizing cost was around  30 Crores, out of which  15.36 Crores was from DONER contribution and remaining from the State coffer. The actual work started off in 2001. The modern look of the stadium was designed by M/S Architect Consultant Pvt. Ltd., Kolkata and its execution was assigned to Civil Engineers Enterprise Ltd. Kolkata. Initially the project was scheduled to be completed by March 2004, but owning the additional work the date was shifted to April 2005.

Upgradation of the stadium

The work on the upgradation of Paljor Stadium was started in April 2001 and has been completed and the Stadium has been since handed over to the Department of Sports & Youth Affairs. The Stadium has an estimated sitting capacity of 25,000 spectators and the accumulated cost of construction stands at Rs. 30.70 crores. It has the following facilities:
International size turf football field.
Electronic scoreboard.
Hostel accommodation.
Media centre.
VIP lounge.
Room for Physiotherapy centre.
Room for multi-gym and fitness centre.
Players’ and officials’ change room.
Inbuilt public address system.
Fire protection system.
Indoor hall for basketball.

The ultra-modern Paljor Stadium was inaugurated by Dr. A.P.J. Abdul Kalam, the President of India on 22 September 2005 in the presence of the  Governor of Sikkim and Dr. Pawan Chamling, Chief Minister of Sikkim.

References

Football venues in Sikkim
Sports venues in Sikkim
United Sikkim F.C.
I-League 2nd Division venues
Sports venues completed in 1943
1943 establishments in Sikkim
20th-century architecture in India